Chapel Market is a daily street market in London. The market is located on a street of the same name near Angel, and sells fruit, vegetables and fish, as well as bargain household goods and cheap clothes. It is open every day except Monday, operating in the mornings only on Thursday and Sunday.  The market is 2-3 blocks long; many of the patrons are local, and food and wares for sale are primarily for daily use.  It has capacity for 224 stalls.

The ten-year-old Islington Farmers' Market relocated to Chapel Market in April 2010 and is held every Sunday at the Penton Street end.

Notable Chapel Market pubs include the Agricultural at the extreme east end, an old institution that got its name from the historic use of Upper Street as a livestock route south into London and specifically to Smithfield meat market.  The Hundred Crows Flying, at the extreme west end of the market is a modern style pub catering more to a hip young crowd.  In the middle of the market near to the corner of White Lion Street is The Alma Lounge, popular with an older crowd, and frequently full early in the day.

The street was also notable for M. Manze's, a traditional Pie and Mash vendor whose first branch was established in 1902. The Chapel Market branch closed down in 2019.

The street was also used for filming street seller scenes in the TV sitcom Only Fools and Horses.

Getting there 
Nearest London Underground station:
Angel

The following street markets are also in Central London:
Berwick Street Market
Petticoat Lane Market
Portobello Road

References

External links
List of all London markets
Description of several London markets

Retail markets in London
Streets in the London Borough of Islington